Ink Master: Battle of the Sexes is the twelfth season of the tattoo reality competition Ink Master that premiered on Paramount Network on June 11, 2019, with a total of 16 episodes. The show is hosted and judged by Jane's Addiction guitarist Dave Navarro, with accomplished tattoo artists Chris Núñez and Oliver Peck serving as series regular judges. The winner received $100,000, a feature in Inked magazine and the title of Ink Master.

The premise of this season was having two teams of 9 artists, split based on their gender, competing as teams until the finale. This season also featured Ink Master winners and veterans coaching the teams in individual episodes, with the males coaching the women's team and the females coaching the men's team. And depending on which gender was eliminated, one coach advanced to the live finale where they competed in the Clash of the Coaches Face-Off for $25,000.

The winner of the twelfth season of Ink Master was Laura Marie, with Dani Ryan being the runner-up. The winner of the Clash of the Coaches Face-Off was Ryan Ashley Malarkey, with DJ Tambe being the runner-up.

Judging and ranking

Judging Panel
The judging panel is a table of three or more primary judges in addition to the coaches. The judges make their final decision by voting to see who had best tattoo of the day, and who goes home.

Jury of Peers
In Season 12, the artist who wins best tattoo of the day gives their respective team the power to put up one artist for elimination.

Contestants
Names, experience, and cities stated are at time of filming.

Notes

Clash of the Coaches Face-Off

Eliminated

Contestant progress
 Indicates the contestant was a part of the Men's team.
 Indicates the contestant was a part of the Women's team.

  The contestant won Ink Master.
 The contestant was the runner-up.
 The contestant finished third in the competition.
 The contestant advanced to the finale.
 The contestant was exempt from the first elimination.
 The contestant won Best Tattoo of the Day.
 The contestant won the Tattoo Marathon.
 The contestant won their Head-to-Head challenge.
 The contestant was among the top.
 The contestant received positive critiques.
 The contestant received mixed critiques.
 The contestant received negative critiques.
 The contestant was in the bottom.
 The contestant was put in the bottom by the Jury of Peers
 The contestant was eliminated from the competition.
 The contestant was put in the bottom by the Jury of Peers and was eliminated from the competition.
 The contestant quit the competition.
 The contestant returned as a guest for that episode.

Episodes

References

External links
 
 
 

Ink Master
2019 American television seasons